Family Business is the debut album by hip hop group 2-4 Family. It was released on 16 March 1999.

Singles
"Stay" was the only track in the album that featured former member Jo O'Meara. and peaked at #8 on the Viva Top 100.
"Lean on Me", the second single taken from the album was a cover version, the original version being recorded by Bill Withers.
"Take Me Home", the third and final single released from this album and also the last 2-4 Family song before the group disbanded, was released on 8 June 1999.

Track listing

Charts

1999 albums